Columbia Carousel or Carousel Columbia are a pair of double-decker carousels at Six Flags Great America in Gurnee, Illinois and California's Great America in Santa Clara, California. Both parks were originally built by the Marriott hotel chain as sister properties but they were later sold off and are presently owned by Six Flags and Cedar Fair, respectively. To this date, Carousel Columbia (the California counterpart) is the world's tallest carousel.

History
The first Columbia opened in the Santa Clara park in 1976 and the Gurnee Columbia opened later that year. The carousel is known as Carousel Columbia at California's Great America and Columbia Carousel at Six Flags Great America.  

In 1994, Santa Clara's Columbia received some minor renovations for its appearance in the movie Beverly Hills Cop III, filmed at the theme park.

Design
The original design of the carousel, then named "The Columbia", was carried out by Randall Duell Associates. Additional scrollwork and decorations were designed by Chris Mueller.

Each of the 103 horses and animals on the carousels is a replica of one of the world's most famous carved carousel animals. A large reflecting pond was installed in front of each carousel with historic replicas of American flags flying along the sides of the pond.

Sixteen original oil paintings by George Gibson are installed on each carousel, depicting scenes from American history. Kris Rowberry publicized the fact, originally from the press release, that elements from Carousel Columbia were originally used on the sets of the films Marie Antoinette (1938) and The Swan (1956).

The two sister carousels may be distinguished by the color of the roof – the Carousel Columbia in California is painted gold, while the Columbia Carousel in Illinois is green – and the flooring – the upper-level of Gurnee's carousel has carpet, while Santa Clara's has a wood floor.

The Columbia is often associated with the Carousel Song, written especially for the Marriott's Great America theme parks by Gene Patrick. The Carousel Song plays at the Santa Clara park periodically throughout the day and plays at the Gurnee park when the park closes.

Animals
Seating on the carousel consists of the following 106 fiberglass replicas:

 88 horses (82 jumping and 6 standing)
 3 chariots
 1 camel
 1 giraffe
 1 lion
 1 tiger
 1 dragon
 1 deer
 1 seahorse
 2 jumping ostriches
 2 jumping pigs
 2 jumping cats
 2 jumping rabbits

The horses include cavalry-style horses, Parker horses, Dentzel horses, and the 1928 "Silver Anniversary Horse" originally carved for the 25th anniversary of the Philadelphia Toboggan Company (found on the Gurnee carousel only). The original 1928 armored horse is displayed in the Circus Hall of Fame. The chariots are replicas of chariots originally carved in 1918 by Daniel Carl Muller.

Gallery

Notes

References

External links

 Carousel Columbia at California's Great America
 Columbia Carousel at Six Flags Great America

Carousels in California
California's Great America
Six Flags Great America
Six Flags attractions
Amusement rides introduced in 1976
Cedar Fair attractions
Amusement rides manufactured by Chance Rides